Irene Mary Bewick Ward, Baroness Ward of North Tyneside,  (23 February 1895 – 26 April 1980) was a British Conservative Party politician. She was a long-serving female Member of Parliament (MP), the longest serving female Conservative MP in history. She later became a life peeress in the House of Lords, and had served a total of 43 years in Parliament.

Career

Ward was educated privately and at Newcastle Church High School. She contested Morpeth in 1924 and 1929 without success and was elected to the House of Commons in 1931 for Wallsend, defeating Labour's Margaret Bondfield. A strong advocate for Tyneside industry and social conditions, she lost her seat in the 1945 general election, which Labour won by a landslide.

In 1950, Ward returned to Parliament for Tynemouth, again defeating a female incumbent, Grace Colman. An active backbencher, she introduced the bill that became the Rights of Entry (Gas and Electricity Boards) Act, 1954. She promoted a Bill to pay pocket money to the elderly living in institutions. She also campaigned for Equal Pay for women in general, and for Florence 'Jean' Winder, the only woman reporter for Hansard, in particular.

Ward worked with Charlotte Bentley who led the "National Association of State Enrolled Assistant Nurses". Her private member's bill passed through parliament to remove the demeaning word "assistant" from the State Enrolled Nurses's job title. This was the Nurses (Amendment) Act, 1961 and the following year there followed the Penalties for Drunkenness Act, 1962. She served on the Public Accounts Committee from 1964.

She is remembered for being a fierce character in the House of Commons who was not shy of argument, openly expressing strong disagreements with ministers in her own party when she felt it necessary. She is remembered in some quarters for an incident which caused amusement on both sides of the House when she threatened to "poke" the then Labour Prime Minister Harold Wilson. Having received an evasive answer to a parliamentary question, she responded with the words: "I will poke the Prime Minister. I will poke him until I get a response." Another incident took place in 1968 when the Labour government started passing large amounts of important legislation by making the House sit into the early hours of morning and making several bill committees sit simultaneously. During a division, Ward stood in front of the mace to prevent the tellers from giving the result on a finance bill. She furiously remarked to the Speaker that "Parliament is turning into a dictatorship, and I protest about it." Ward refused to relent and was escorted out the chamber by the serjeant-at-arms. She quipped: "Do you want my right or my left arm?"

Ward retired from the Commons in February 1974, having served a total of almost 38 years. She was the longest-serving female MP until that record was broken by Gwyneth Dunwoody in 2007. Aged 79 at her retirement, Ward was at that time also the oldest-ever serving female Member of Parliament and the oldest-ever woman to be re-elected, records not broken until Ann Clwyd achieved both in 2017.

Honours
She was created a life peer as Baroness Ward of North Tyneside, of North Tyneside in the County of Tyne and Wear, on 23 January 1975.

Ward was appointed a Commander of the Order of the British Empire (CBE) in 1929 and promoted to Dame Commander (DBE) in 1955, and was appointed a Companion of Honour in 1973.

See also
 Women in the House of Commons of the United Kingdom

References

External links 
 
Catalogue of the papers of Irene Ward, Baroness Ward of North Tyneside, 1860-1980
The Peerage website
Irene Ward on the UK Parliament website

1895 births
1980 deaths
Female members of the Parliament of the United Kingdom for English constituencies
Conservative Party (UK) MPs for English constituencies
Life peeresses created by Elizabeth II
Dames Commander of the Order of the British Empire
Members of the Order of the Companions of Honour
People from Tynemouth
Politicians from Tyne and Wear
People from Wallsend
Place of death missing
UK MPs 1931–1935
UK MPs 1935–1945
UK MPs 1950–1951
UK MPs 1951–1955
UK MPs 1955–1959
UK MPs 1959–1964
UK MPs 1964–1966
UK MPs 1966–1970
UK MPs 1970–1974
UK MPs who were granted peerages
20th-century British women politicians
20th-century English women
20th-century English people